Aldo Andreotti (15 March 1924 – 21 February 1980) was an Italian mathematician who worked on algebraic geometry, on the theory of functions of several complex variables and on partial differential operators. Notably he proved the Andreotti–Frankel theorem, the Andreotti–Grauert theorem, the Andreotti–Vesentini theorem and introduced, jointly with François Norguet, the Andreotti–Norguet integral representation for functions of several complex variables.

Andreotti was a visiting scholar at the Institute for Advanced Study in 1951 and again from 1957 through 1959.

Selected publications
Aldo Andreotti published 100 scientific works, including papers, books and lecture notes: many of them, except all his books but , are collected in his "Selecta" . In his "Selecta" are also included three unpublished sets of lecture notes, the first one prepared by Philippe Artzner from a course on the theory of analytic functions of several complex variables held by Andreotti during winter 1961 at the University of Strasbourg, the second and third ones taken from two lectures held by Francesco Gherardelli at the "Seminario di Geometria" of the Scuola Normale Superiore during the years 1971–1972 and 1971–1972 respectively, on topics concerning his joint work with Andreotti: despite their nature of unpublished works,  states that they have brought significant contributions to research.

Articles
. 
.
.
.
.
.
.

Books
.
.
.
. A short course in the theory of functions of several complex variables, held in February 1972 at the Centro Linceo Interdisciplinare di Scienze Matematiche e Loro Applicazioni "Beniamino Segre".
.
. 
. The first volume of his selected works, collecting his and his coworkers contributions in algebraic geometry.
. The first part (tomo) of the second volume of his selected works, collecting his and his coworkers contributions to the theory of functions of several complex variables.
. The second part (tomo) of the second volume of his selected works, collecting his and his coworkers contributions to the theory of functions of several complex variables.
. The third and last volume of his selected works, collecting his and his coworkers contributions to the theory partial differential operators in the form of the study of complexes of differential operators.

See also
Bochner–Martinelli formula
Chain complexes
Cohomology

Notes

References

Biographical and general references
.
.
.

. Includes a publication list.
. A "commemoration" by a colleague and friend, including a publication list.
. The biographical and bibliographical entry (updated up to 1976) on Aldo Andreotti, published under the auspices of the Accademia dei Lincei in a book collecting many profiles of its living members up to 1976.
. Recollections on him by a coauthor, colleague and friend.
. "Recollection of Aldo Andreotti" is the commemoration of Andreotti held by Vesentini at the Sala degli Stemmi of the Scuola Normale Superiore on 2 May 1980.
. The "Premise" by Vesentini to the second volume of Andreotti's Selecta.

Scientific references

.

External links
 
 
 Aldo Andreotti

1924 births
1980 deaths
20th-century Italian mathematicians
Complex analysts
University of Pisa alumni
Academic staff of the University of Pisa
Institute for Advanced Study visiting scholars
Members of the Lincean Academy
PDE theorists
Scientists from Florence
Scuola Normale Superiore di Pisa alumni
Members of the Göttingen Academy of Sciences and Humanities